Shreyas Santosh Iyer (born 6 December 1994) is an Indian international  cricketer who plays for the Indian cricket team as a Right-handed batter. He has played in all formats for the Indian team. Iyer has scored a century in his debut test match and a half century in second innings against New Zealand in November 2021 and became the first Indian player to do so. Iyer plays for Mumbai in domestic cricket and captains Kolkata Knight Riders in the Indian Premier League. He played for the India Under-19 cricket team at the 2014 ICC Under-19 Cricket World Cup.

Early years
Shreyas Iyer was born on 6 December 1994 in Chembur, Mumbai to Santosh Iyer a Tamilian father and his mother Rohini Iyer a Tuluva. His ancestors from Thrissur, Kerala.  He was educated at Don Bosco High School, Matunga and at Ramniranjan Anandilal Podar College of Commerce and Economics, Mumbai.

At the age of 18, Iyer was spotted by coach Pravin Amre at the Shivaji Park Gymkhana. Amre trained him in his early cricketing days. Iyer's teammates at the age group levels used to compare him to Virender Sehwag. During his graduation from Podar College in Mumbai, Iyer helped his college team to lift some trophies.

Domestic career
In 2014, Iyer represented Trent Bridge Cricket Team. During a trip of the UK, he played three matches scoring 297 runs at an average of 99 with a highest score of 171, a new team record.

Iyer made his List A debut for Mumbai in November 2014, playing in the 2014–15 Vijay Hazare Trophy. He scored 273 runs in that tournament at an average of 54.60. Iyer made his first-class cricket debut in December 2014 during the 2014–15 Ranji Trophy. He scored a total of 809 runs in his debut Ranji season at an average of 50.56 including two centuries and six fifties. He was 7th highest scorer of 2014–15 Ranji Trophy.

In the 2015–16 Ranji Trophy, Iyer scored 1,321 runs during the tournament including four centuries and seven fifties at an average of 73.39, becoming the top scorer of the Ranji season and second player to score 1,300 runs in a single Ranji Trophy competition. In the 2016–17 Ranji Trophy, Iyer scored 725 runs including two centuries and two fifties at an average of 42.64. He scored 202 not out off 210 balls, against the visiting Australia team in a 3-Day Practice match in Mumbai, his highest first-class score.

In September 2018, Iyer was named as the vice-captain of Mumbai for the 2018–19 Vijay Hazare Trophy tournament. He was the leading run-scorer for Mumbai in the tournament, with 373 runs in seven matches. In October 2018, Iyer was named as the captain of India B's squad for the 2018–19 Deodhar Trophy. He was also the leading run-scorer in the Deodhar Trophy, with 199 runs in three matches.

In February 2019, in the opening round of the 2018–19 Syed Mushtaq Ali Trophy tournament, Iyer made the highest total by an Indian batsman in a T20 match, when he scored 147 runs.

In March 2021, Iyer was signed by Lancashire for their 2021 season of the Royal London One-Day Cup.

Indian Premier League
In February 2015, Iyer was signed in the 2015 IPL players auction by the Delhi Daredevils for 2.6 crores (approximately $430,000). Thus Iyer became the highest-earning uncapped player in the tournament.  He scored 439 runs in 14 matches, with a 33.76 average and a strike rate of 128.36, making Iyer the 9th most consistent player and Emerging Player of 2015 IPL.

Iyer was retained by Delhi Daredevils in the 2018 IPL Auction. On 25 April 2018, he was announced as the new captain of Delhi Daredevils replacing Gautam Gambhir. On 27 April 2018, he became the youngest captain to lead the Delhi Daredevils team in the IPL history at the age of 23 years and 142 days during the match against Kolkata Knight Riders and was also the fourth overall youngest to captain any IPL side. On his IPL captaincy debut, Shreyas Iyer smashed an unbeaten match-winning knock of 93 off 40 deliveries with 10 sixes, which was his third successive IPL fifty of the season to power DD to a heavy total of 219/5 in the first innings of the match before earning him the man of the match award. Under his captaincy, Delhi Daredevils managed to defeat KKR by 55 runs to secure only their second win of the tournament.
Iyer was retained by the Delhi Capitals in the IPL 2019 Season which he led the team into the playoffs for the first time after seven years.

In the 2020 season, he continued as the captain for Delhi Capitals and he also led them to their maiden IPL final against the Mumbai Indians. Iyer scored an unbeaten 65 off 50 balls in a losing effort as Mumbai Indians won the final.

He missed the half season of IPL 2021 due to an injury in his Left Shoulder while playing for India in the first match of an ODI series against England in the same year. He made his comeback after a Span of 6 months for Delhi Capitals. In the 2022 IPL Auction, Iyer was bought by the Kolkata Knight Riders for ₹ 12.25 crores. He was also named as the team's captain.

International career
In March 2017, Iyer was added to India's Test squad as cover for Virat Kohli, ahead of the fourth Test against Australia. He came on as a substitute fielder in the fourth test and ran out Steve O'Keefe for 8.

In October 2017, Iyer was named in India's Twenty20 International (T20I) squad for their series against New Zealand. He made his T20I debut for India against New Zealand on 1 November 2017, but he did not bat.

In November 2017, Iyer was named in India's One Day International (ODI) squad for their series against Sri Lanka. He made his ODI debut for India against Sri Lanka on 10 December 2017. He scored 88 from 70 balls in the 2nd ODI against Sri Lanka at Mohali.

On 18 December 2019, in the second ODI against the West Indies, Iyer scored 31 runs in one over, the most scored by a batsman for India in a single over in ODIs.
 
On 24 January 2020, in the first T20I against the New Zealand, Iyer scored an unbeaten 58 off 29 balls and was declared the Man of the Match.

On 26 January 2020, in the second T20I against the New Zealand, he scored 44 off 33 balls. On 5 February 2020, in the first ODI against the New Zealand, Iyer scored 103 off 107 balls, his maiden century in ODI cricket.

In September 2021, Iyer was named as one of three reserve players in India's squad for the 2021 ICC Men's T20 World Cup. In November 2021, he was named in India's Test squad for their series against New Zealand. He made his Test debut on 25 November 2021, for India against New Zealand.

On 25 November 2021, Iyer got his Test cap from the former Indian cricketer Sunil Gavaskar and scored a maiden century playing against the New Zealand team. He became the 16th Indian player to score a century in the debut test match.

In the 2022 bilateral T20I series against Sri Lanka, Iyer broke Virat Kohli's record of most runs scored by an Indian batsman in a 3-match T20I bilateral series, scoring a total of 204 runs with three consecutive unbeaten half centuries.

In March 2022, Iyer was named man of the match after scoring two crucial fifties on a tough turning track in the second Test match against Sri Lanka. In recognition of Iyer's good form, he was named as the ICC player of the month for February 2022. On 9 October 2022, during the 2nd of 3 ODI matches against South Africa, he achieved his 2nd ODI century scoring 113 off 111 balls, and remained unbeaten.

References

External links 
 
 

1994 births
Living people
Indian cricketers
India Test cricketers
India One Day International cricketers
India Twenty20 International cricketers
Mumbai cricketers
Indian A cricketers
Delhi Capitals cricketers
Cricketers who made a century on Test debut
Kolkata Knight Riders cricketers